Boxing at the 2015 Indian Ocean Island Games was held at Gymnase Nelson Mandela, Saint-Pierre, Réunion.

Medalist

Men

External links
 Official website

2015 Indian Ocean Island Games events
Boxing at the Indian Ocean Island Games
2015 in boxing